Lilli is a village in Anija Parish, Harju County in northern Estonia. located on the right bank of the Jägala River, about  north of the town of Kehra. Lilli has a population of 118 (as of 1 January 2010).

References

Villages in Harju County